Chaker Ghezal (born 14 January 1977) is a former Tunisian male volleyball player. He was part of the Tunisia men's national volleyball team. He competed with the national team at the 2004 Summer Olympics in Athens, Greece. He played with Étoile Sportive du Sahel in 2004.

Clubs
  E.S. Sahel (2004)

See also
 Tunisia at the 2004 Summer Olympics

References

1977 births
Living people
Tunisian men's volleyball players
Tunisian volleyball coaches
Place of birth missing (living people)
Volleyball players at the 2004 Summer Olympics
Olympic volleyball players of Tunisia